William Hunter (2 April 1885 – 1937) was a Scottish professional football player and manager. He managed the Dutch national side, Austrian club side Hakoah Vienna, Swiss club side Lausanne Sports, the Turkish national side and Galatasaray.

As a player he played for Millwall Athletic and Bolton Wanderers.

Honours

Player 
Bolton Wanderers
Second Division: 1908–09
Promotion: 1910–11

Manager 
Dordrecht
KNVB Cup: 1913–14
Runner-up: 1912–13

Hakoah Vienna
Austrian League:
Runner-up 1921–22

Lausanne Sports
Swiss Serie A West: 
Runner-up 1922–23

Galatasaray
Atatürk Gazi Cup: 1928
Istanbul League: 1924–25, 1925–26, 1926–27

References

Date of death missing
Scottish footballers
Scottish football managers
Scottish expatriate sportspeople in the Netherlands
Scottish expatriate sportspeople in Switzerland
Scottish expatriate sportspeople in Turkey
Scottish expatriate sportspeople in Austria
Millwall F.C. players
Bolton Wanderers F.C. players
Expatriate football managers in the Netherlands
Expatriate football managers in Switzerland
Expatriate football managers in Austria
Expatriate football managers in Turkey
British Army personnel of World War I
1885 births
Scottish expatriate football managers
FC Dordrecht managers
Galatasaray S.K. (football) managers
FC Lausanne-Sport managers
SC Hakoah Wien managers
Association football forwards
Scottish emigrants to the United States
1937 deaths